Kingsland Bay State Park is a 264-acre state park in Ferrisburgh, Vermont, on the shore of Lake Champlain.

Activities includes swimming, boating, fishing, hiking, picnicking, bicycling, wildlife watching, and winter sports.

Facilities include boat rentals, a small beach with a snack bar, a picnic pavilion with two group grills and a smaller grill, other picnic tables, a horseshoe pit and toilets. There are several buildings available to rent for large group gatherings.

The State of Vermont has designated 50 acres as the Kingsland Bay Natural Area. The area includes two peninsulas on Lake Champlain separated by Kingsland Bay that support unspoiled natural plant communities, on the shoreline as well as on and behind their bluffs. The Hulburt (western) portion features a lake bluff cedar-pine forest.

References

External links
 Official web site

State parks of Vermont
Ferrisburgh, Vermont
Protected areas of Addison County, Vermont